Riddick House may refer to:

Hoffman-Bowers-Josey-Riddick House, Scotland Neck, NC, listed on the NRHP in North Carolina
 Riddick House (Como, North Carolina), listed on the NRHP in North Carolina
 Riddick House (Suffolk, Virginia), listed on the NRHP in Virginia